Homa Darabi (1940–1994) was an Iranian child psychiatrist, academic, and political activist affiliated with the Nation Party of Iran. She is known for her political self-immolation in protest to the compulsory hijab, which led to her death.

Biography 
Darabi was born in 1940 in Tehran. Following the end of high school, she entered Medical School of University of Tehran in 1959. In 1960, she was detained for an organizing a student demonstration in favor of the National Front. She married her classmate Manoochehr Keyhani in 1963. After completing her studies, she practiced in the village Bahmanieh, located in northern Iran. Darabi went to the United States to continue her studies, and obtained a pediatrics specialist degree in psychology. She returned to Iran in 1976 and was employed as a professor of child psychiatry at University of Tehran, while she became once again politically active against the Pahlavi dynasty. She also taught at the National University (later known as Shahid Beheshti University).

She was dismissed from her position for "non-adherence to hijab" in December 1991. Although a tribunal in May 1993 overturned the decision, the university refused to restore her position.

Death 
As a sign of protest, Darabi immolated herself by pouring petrol over her head on 21 February 1994, after she had taken her hijab off in a public thoroughfare near Tajrish.

She died from the burns in a hospital the next day.

See also 
 2017–2019 Iranian protests against compulsory hijab
 Death of Mahsa Amini
 Guidance Patrol, Iran's morality police
 List of political self-immolations
 Zahra Bani Yaghoub

Further reading

References

Iranian pediatricians
Iranian feminists
Suicides by self-immolation
1940 births
1994 deaths
Hijab
Suicides in Iran
Iranian psychiatrists
Iranian women physicians
Women psychiatrists
Nation Party of Iran politicians
National Front (Iran) student activists
20th-century Iranian physicians
Iranian expatriates in the United States
University of Tehran alumni
Academic staff of the University of Tehran
Academic staff of Shahid Beheshti University
Politicians from Tehran
1994 suicides